Petershill Partners is an investment company specialising in alternative investments: investors in the business are able to participate, through minority investments, in the profits of large private equity and hedge funds. It is listed on the London Stock Exchange and is a constituent of the FTSE 250 Index.

History
The company was established by Goldman Sachs in 2007. Between its inception and its initial public offering (IPO) in September 2021, it raised and invested US$8.5 billion in funds. However, in the immediate aftermath of its IPO the company lost nearly 10% of its value.

References

Private equity firms of the United States
Financial services companies established in 2007